DZVG-TV (channel 5) is a television station in Barlig, Mountain Province, Philippines, airing programming from the GMA network. Owned and operated by the network's namesake corporate parent, the station maintains hybrid analog/digital transmitting facility atop Mount Amuyao, Barlig, Mountain Province.

On March 13, 2023, GMA Mountain Province commenced digital test broadcasts on UHF Channel 29 covering Mountain Province and Ifugao, as well as several parts of Kalinga, Cagayan, Isabela, Quirino, and Nueva Vizcaya.

Digital television

Digital channels
UHF Channel 29 (563.143 MHz)

Area of coverage

Primary areas 
 Mountain Province 
 Ifugao

Secondary areas 
 Parts of Kalinga
 Parts of Cagayan
 Parts of Isabela
 Parts of Nueva Vizcaya
 Parts of Quirino

GMA TV-5 Mountain Province programs
One North Central Luzon - flagship afternoon newscast (simulcast on TV-10 Dagupan)
Mornings with GMA Regional TV - flagship morning newscast simulcast on GMA TV-10 Dagupan

References

See also 
DZEA-TV
List of GMA Network stations

GMA Network stations
Television stations in Mountain Province
Television channels and stations established in 2011
Digital television stations in the Philippines